Georgy Ivanovich Bobrikov (Russian, Георгий Иванович Бобриков, 1840 - 1924) was an Imperial Russian division commander. He was the brother of Nikolay Bobrikov. He had another brother, Ivan (1835-1880). He fought in World War I against the Ottoman Empire. After the October Revolution of November 1917, he emigrated to Switzerland.

Awards 
Order of Saint Anna, 3rd class, 1868
Order of Saint Stanislaus (House of Romanov), 2nd class, 1870
Order of Saint Vladimir, 4th class, 1871
Order of Saint Anna, 2nd class, 1874
Order of Saint Vladimir, 3rd class, 1876
Gold Sword for Bravery, 1877
Order of Saint George, 1878
Order of Saint Stanislaus (House of Romanov), 1st class, 1880
Order of Saint Anna, 1st class, 1883
Order of Saint Vladimir, 2nd class, 1886
Order of the White Eagle (Russian Empire), 1891
Order of Saint Alexander Nevsky, 1898
Order of Saint Vladimir, 1st class, 1910

References 
 Бобриков, Георгий Иванович. 577. 4
 Глиноецкий Н. П. Исторический очерк Николаевской академии Генерального штаба. СПб., 1882
 Милорадович Г. А. Список лиц свиты их величеств с царствования императора Петра I по 1886 год. СПб., 1886
 Список генералам по старшинству на 1886 г.
 Шилов Д. Н., Кузьмин Ю. А. Члены Государственного совета Российской империи. 1801—1906: Биобиблиографический справочник. СПб., 2007
 Бобриков Георгий Иванович

1840 births
1924 deaths
Russian military personnel of the Russo-Turkish War (1877–1878)
Recipients of the Order of St. Anna, 3rd class
Recipients of the Order of Saint Stanislaus (Russian), 2nd class
Recipients of the Order of St. Vladimir, 4th class
Recipients of the Order of St. Anna, 2nd class
Recipients of the Order of St. Vladimir, 3rd class
Recipients of the Gold Sword for Bravery
Recipients of the Order of Saint Stanislaus (Russian), 1st class
Recipients of the Order of St. Anna, 1st class
Recipients of the Order of St. Vladimir, 2nd class
Recipients of the Order of the White Eagle (Russia)
Recipients of the Order of St. Vladimir, 1st class